Ice crystals are solid ice exhibiting atomic ordering on various length scales and include hexagonal columns, hexagonal plates, dendritic crystals, and diamond dust.

Formation 
The hugely symmetric shapes are due to depositional growth, namely, direct deposition of water vapor onto the ice crystal. Depending on environmental temperature and humidity, ice crystals can develop from the initial hexagonal prism into numerous symmetric shapes. Possible shapes for ice crystals are columns, needles, plates and dendrites. If the crystal migrates into regions with different environmental conditions, the growth pattern may change, and the final crystal may show mixed patterns. Ice crystals tend to fall with their major axis aligned along the horizontal, and are thus visible in polarimetric weather radar signatures with enhanced (positive) differential reflectivity values. Electrification of ice crystals can induce alignments different from the horizontal. Electrified ice crystals are also well detectable by polarimetric weather radars.

Temperature and humidity determine many different crystalline forms. Ice crystals are responsible for various atmospheric optics displays.

Ice clouds are composed of ice crystals, the most notable being cirrus clouds and ice fog. The slight whitening of a clear blue sky caused by ice crystals high in the troposphere can be a sign that a weather front (and rain) is approaching, as moist air is carried to high levels and freezes to ice crystals.

Geometry 
At ambient temperature and pressure, water molecules have a V shape. The two hydrogen atoms bond to the oxygen atom at a 105° angle.

Common ice crystals are symmetrical and have a hexagonal pattern.

Square crystals 
Square ice crystals form at room temperature when squeezed between two layers of graphene. The material is a new crystalline phase of ice, joining 17 others. The research derived from the earlier discovery that water vapor and liquid water could pass through laminated sheets of graphene oxide, unlike smaller molecules such as helium. The effect is thought to be driven by the van der Waals force, which may involve more than 10,000 atmospheres of pressure.

See also
 Snow
 Snowflake
 Ice spike
 Ice lens
 Icicle

References

External links 
 SnowCrystals.com!, at Caltech
 American Meteorological Society Glossary

Crystal
Crystal
Clouds, fog and precipitation
Atmospheric optical phenomena